Fayetteville Confederate Cemetery is a cemetery for soldiers of the Confederate States located on the eastern side of Fayetteville in Washington County, Arkansas. Added to the National Register of Historic Places (NRHP) in 1993, the cemetery encompasses .

History

Many American Civil War battles were fought in northwest Arkansas, including the Battle of Cane Hill, Battle of Pea Ridge, Battle of Prairie Grove, and many small skirmishes such as the action at Fayetteville. Initially scattered throughout Benton County and Washington County, efforts in 1878 by the Southern Memorial Association of Washington County succeeded in collecting the remains of fallen Confederate soldiers and burying them in the new Confederate cemetery. The Association paid for the remains to be moved and re-interred.

Design
The hundreds of graves are arranged into tree-shaded rows surrounded by an 1885 wall of native stone. The cemetery also offers a view from the hill down onto Fayetteville. A monument was constructed around 1898 at the center of the cemetery.

See also
 Fayetteville National Cemetery
 National Register of Historic Places listings in Washington County, Arkansas

References

External links

 Encyclopedia of Arkansas History & Culture entry
 
 

Cemeteries on the National Register of Historic Places in Arkansas
Confederate cemeteries in Arkansas
National Register of Historic Places in Fayetteville, Arkansas
Protected areas of Washington County, Arkansas
Tourist attractions in Fayetteville, Arkansas
1873 establishments in Arkansas
Cemeteries established in the 1870s